Vancouver-Kensington is a provincial electoral district of the Legislative Assembly of British Columbia in Canada.

Member of Legislative Assembly 
Since 2009, the district's member of the Legislative Assembly (MLA) has been Mable Elmore. She represents the British Columbia New Democratic Party.

History

Election results 

|-

|-
 
|NDP
|Ujjal Dosanjh
|align="right"|7,478
|align="right"|38.82%
|align="right"|
|align="right"|$62,038

|}

|-
 
|NDP
|Ujjal Dosanjh
|align="right"|9,496
|align="right"|50.74%
|align="right"|
|align="right"|$49,807

|-

|}

|-
 
|NDP
|Ujjal Dosanjh
|align="right"|8,323
|align="right"|46.85%
|align="right"|
|align="right"|$37,210
|-

|}

References

External links 

BC Stats
Map
Results of 2001 election (pdf)
2001 Expenditures (pdf)
Results of 1996 election
1996 Expenditures
Results of 1991 election
1991 Expenditures
Website of the Legislative Assembly of British Columbia

Politics of Vancouver
British Columbia provincial electoral districts
Provincial electoral districts in Greater Vancouver and the Fraser Valley